Counterfeit e.p. is the first solo recording by Martin L. Gore, the primary songwriter for the band Depeche Mode.

Background
Released in 1989, Counterfeit is a six-song E.P. of cover songs, hence the name, implying that the songs were not written by Gore. Counterfeit was recorded during a band hiatus after recording and touring for the album Music for the Masses; bandmate Alan Wilder also recorded and released Hydrology under the pseudonym Recoil during this period.

Even though the release has the letters "e.p." in its title, Mute Records issued it an album catalogue number (STUMM67).  The German word for "mute" is  stumm .

In France and Germany a promo single for "In a Manner of Speaking" was released.

Track listing

CD: Mute / CDSTUMM67 United Kingdom 
"Compulsion"  – 5:26 (written and originally recorded by Joe Crow)
"In a Manner of Speaking"  – 4:19 (written by Winston Tong, originally recorded by Tuxedomoon)
"Smile in the Crowd"  – 5:02 (written by Vini Reilly, originally recorded by The Durutti Column)
"Gone"  – 3:28 (written by Stephen Fellows, Mik Glaisher, Andy Peake, Kevin Bacon, originally recorded by Comsat Angels)
"Never Turn Your Back on Mother Earth"  – 3:02 (written by Ron Mael, originally recorded by Sparks)
"Motherless Child"  – 2:48 (Traditional)

Credits 
Engineered by Rico Conning
Produced by Martin L. Gore and Rico Conning at Sam Therapy Studios, London

See also 
Counterfeit²

References

External links
 Album information from the official Martin Gore web site
 Martin Gore official website
 Depeche Mode official website
 Review Summary

1989 debut EPs
Martin Gore albums
Covers EPs
Mute Records EPs